K-19: The Widowmaker is a 2002 historical submarine film directed and produced by Kathryn Bigelow, and produced by Edward S. Feldman, Sigurjon Sighvatsson, Christine Whitaker and Matthias Deyle with screenplay by Christopher Kyle. An international production of the United States, United Kingdom, Germany and Canada, the film takes place in 1961 and focuses its story on the Soviet Hotel-class submarine K-19.

The film stars Harrison Ford and Liam Neeson alongside Peter Sarsgaard, Donald Sumpter, Christian Camargo, Michael Gladis and John Shrapnel in supporting roles.

K-19: The Widowmaker was released by Paramount Pictures on July 19, 2002 in the United States while on September 5, 2002 in Germany and October 25, 2002 in the United Kingdom. Upon release, the film received generally mixed reviews from critics, which particularly praised the performances and the dramatic atmosphere but criticized the screenwriting. The film became a box-office bomb grossing $65 million against a production budget of $90 million.

Plot
In 1961, the Soviet Union launches its first ballistic missile nuclear submarine, the K-19, commanded by Captain Alexei Vostrikov, with executive officer Mikhail Polenin, the crew's original captain. Vostrikov is alleged to have been appointed through his wife's political connections, as well as Polenin's tendency to put crew morale and safety before Soviet pride. Discovering the reactor officer drunk and asleep on duty, Vostrikov fires him, receiving a replacement, Vadim Radtchenko, fresh from the academy. The launch is plagued by misfortune; the medical officer is killed by a truck and the inaugural bottle of champagne fails to break on the bow.

The K-19s first mission is to surface in the Arctic, test-fire an unarmed intercontinental ballistic missile, and patrol the Atlantic within striking range of New York City and Washington, D.C. Vostrikov orders K-19 to submerge past its maximum operational depth, then surface at full-speed to break through the Arctic pack-ice. Protesting the dangerous maneuver, Polenin storms off the bridge. The test missile launches successfully.

A reactor coolant pipe bursts. Control rods are inserted into the reactor, but the temperature rises; back-up coolant systems were not installed. K-19 surfaces to contact fleet command but the long-range transmitter antenna cable is damaged. Engineers rig a makeshift coolant system, working in shifts to limit radiation exposure. The first team emerges vomiting and blistered. The second and third teams cool the reactor, but all suffer radiation poisoning. With radiation levels rising, the submarine surfaces and most of the crew are ordered topside. Radtchenko balks after seeing the first team's injuries, and the crew chief takes his place on the third team.

A Sikorsky H-34 helicopter from a nearby United States Navy destroyer offers assistance, which Vostrikov rejects. The Soviet government grows concerned when the K-19 ceases contact but is spotted near the destroyer. Hoping diesel submarines will be sent to tow the K-19, Vostrikov orders a return to port. The repaired pipework leaks causing the reactor temperature to raise. Torpedo fuel ignites a fire. Initially ordering the fire suppression system activated – which would suffocate anyone in the area – Vostrikov is talked down by Polenin, who personally assists the fire crew. Two officers mutiny against Vostrikov and Radtchenko enters the reactor alone to attempt repairs.

Polenin deceives the mutineers into handing over their weapons, arrests them, and frees Vostrikov. Unaware of Radtchenko, Vostrikov, at Polenin's behest, announces his plan to dive and attempt another repair, fearing an overheating reactor could set off their warheads and incite nuclear war. The crew responds positively, and K-19 dives. Radtchenko's repairs are successful. Blinded and weakened by the radiation, he is dragged to safety by Vostrikov. A meltdown is prevented, but irradiated steam leaks throughout the submarine.

A Soviet diesel submarine reaches K-19, with orders to confine the crew aboard until a freighter can pick them up. Vostrikov instead orders an evacuation. Returning to the Soviet Union, Vostrikov is tried for endangering the mission and disobeying a direct order, but Polenin comes to his defense. In all, twenty seven men died from radiation sickness.

In 1989, an aged Vostrikov meets Polenin and other survivors at a cemetery on the anniversary of their rescue. Vostrikov reveals that he nominated the deceased crewmen for the Hero of the Soviet Union award, but was told the honor was reserved for combat veterans. Remarking "what good are honors from such people," Vostrikov toasts the survivors and those who sacrificed their lives.

An epilogue reveals Vostrikov was acquitted, but the K-19 crew was sworn to secrecy and Vostrikov was never again given a command.

Cast

 Harrison Ford as Captain 2nd Rank Alexei Vostrikov, Commanding Officer
 Liam Neeson as Captain 3rd Rank Mikhail "Misha" Polenin, Executive Officer
 Peter Sarsgaard as Lieutenant Vadim Radtchenko, Reactor Officer
 Joss Ackland as Marshal Zolentsov, Defence Minister
 John Shrapnel as Admiral Bratyeev
 Donald Sumpter as Captain 3rd Rank Gennadi Savran, Medical Officer
 Tim Woodward as Vice-Admiral Konstantin Partonov
 Steve Nicolson as Captain 3rd Rank Yuri Demichev, Torpedo Officer
 Ravil Isyanov as Captain 3rd Rank Igor Suslov, Political Officer
 Christian Camargo as Petty Officer Pavel Loktev, Senior Reactor Technician
 George Anton as Captain-Lieutenant Konstantin Poliansky, Missile Officer
 James Francis Ginty as Seaman Anatoly Subachev, Reactor Technician
 Lex Shrapnel as Captain-Lieutenant Mikhail Kornilov, Communications Officer
 Ingvar Eggert Sigurðsson as Captain 3rd Rank Viktor Gorelov, Chief Engineer
 Sam Spruell as Senior Seaman Dmitri Nevsky
 Sam Redford as Petty Officer 2nd Class Vasily Mishin
 Peter Stebbings as Kuryshev
 Shaun Benson as Chief Petty Officer Leonid Pashinski
 Kristen Holden-Ried as Captain-Lieutenant Anton Malahov
 Dmitry Chepovetsky as Sergei Maximov
 Tygh Runyan as Petty Officer 1st Class Maxim Portenko, Sonar Operator
 Jacob Pitts as Grigori
 Michael Gladis as Senior Seaman Yevgeny Borzenkov
 JJ Feild as Andrei Pritoola
 Peter Oldring as Vanya Belov
 Joshua Close as Viktor
 Jeremy Akerman as Fyodor Tsetkov, Captain of the S-270

Production
K-19: The Widowmaker cost $100 million to produce, but gross returns were only $35 million in the United States and $30.5 million internationally. The film was not financed by a major studio (National Geographic was owned by National Geographic Partners, a joint venture with 21st Century Fox and The National Geographic Society), making it one of the most expensive independent films to-date. K-19: The Widowmaker was filmed in Canada, specifically Toronto, Ontario; Gimli, Manitoba; and Halifax, Nova Scotia.

The producers made some efforts to work with the original crew of K-19, who took exception to the first version of the script available to them. The submarine's captain presented an open letter to the actors and production team, and a group of officers and crew members presented another. In a later script, several scenes were cut, and the names of the crew changed at the request of the crew members and their families.

The  K-19 was portrayed in the film by the Juliett-class K-77, which was significantly modified for the role. HMCS Ojibwa portrayed the Soviet  S-270.  portrayed . The Canadian Halifax Shipyard stood in for the Sevmash shipyard of northern Russia.

Klaus Badelt wrote the film's late-Romantic-styled score.

Historical accuracy
The nickname "The Widowmaker" was used only in the film. In real life, the submarine had no nickname until the nuclear accident on July 3, 1961, when it received the nickname "Hiroshima".

The film shows several officers attempting to commit mutiny aboard the K-19. In real life, there was no mutiny attempt, though Captain Zatayev was worried enough about the possibility of mutiny that he had almost of all the submarine's small arms thrown overboard.

Reception
K-19: The Widowmaker received mixed reviews. It has a 61% approval rating on Rotten Tomatoes based on 170 reviews, with an average score of 6.09/10. It is summarized as being "A gripping drama even though the filmmakers have taken liberties with the facts." Metacritic calculated an average score of 58 out of 100 based on 35 reviews, indicating "mixed or average reviews". Audiences polled by CinemaScore gave the film an average grade of "B" on an A+ to F scale.

When K-19: The Widowmaker was premiered in Russia in October 2002, 52 veterans of the K-19 submarine accepted flights to the Saint Petersburg premiere; despite what they saw as technical as well as historical compromises, they praised the film and, in particular, the performance of Harrison Ford.

In his review, film critic Roger Ebert compared K-19: The Widowmaker to other classic films of the genre, "Movies involving submarines have the logic of chess: The longer the game goes, the fewer the possible remaining moves. K-19: The Widowmaker joins a tradition that includes Das Boot and The Hunt for Red October and goes all the way back to Run Silent, Run Deep. The variables are always oxygen, water pressure and the enemy. Can the men breathe, will the sub implode, will depth charges destroy it?"

Stanley Kauffmann of The New Republic wrote: "Why did movie moguls think that this was the right moment for a tale of unflinching loyalty to the Soviet Union?"

In a 2023 interview with James Hibberd of The Hollywood Reporter, Ford cited his role as Alexei Vostrikov as one of his roles he is most proud of regardless how K-19: The Widowmaker was received, as he considers it a good movie and that's why he is proud of it.

References

Notes

Bibliography

 Huchthausen, Peter. K-19, The Widowmaker: The Secret Story of The Soviet Nuclear Submarine. Washington, D.C.: National Geographic, 2002. .
 K-19, The Widowmaker: Handbook of Production Information. Los Angeles, California: Paramount Pictures, 2002.

External links

 
 
 
 
 
 
 

2002 films
2000s disaster films
2000s historical drama films
American disaster films
American historical drama films
American survival films
British disaster films
British historical drama films
Canadian disaster films
Canadian historical drama films
Cold War submarine films
Disaster films based on actual events
English-language Canadian films
English-language German films
Films about death
Films about friendship
Films about survivors of seafaring accidents or incidents
Films based on short fiction
Films directed by Kathryn Bigelow
Films scored by Klaus Badelt
Films set in 1961
Films set in 1989
Films set in Moscow
Films set in Russia
Films set in the Soviet Union
Films shot at Pinewood Studios
Films shot in Manitoba
Films shot in Moscow
Films shot in Nova Scotia
Films shot in Russia
Films shot in Toronto
German disaster films
German historical drama films
Films about nuclear accidents and incidents
Paramount Pictures films
2000s Russian-language films
Seafaring films based on actual events
Submarine films
2002 drama films
Films produced by Edward S. Feldman
Military of Russia in films
2000s American films
2000s Canadian films
2000s British films
2000s German films